LÉ Banba (CM11) was a  in the Irish Naval Service (INS) and was one of three purchased by the Irish government in light of changing politics in Northern Ireland that was creating more gunrunning, and, the beginning of the drugs trade.

LÉ Banba was named after Banba, a legendary queen of the Tuatha Dé Danann and also a poetic name for Ireland. The ship was the former Royal Navy vessel .

Handover
The name Banba was originally allocated to be borne by one of the six s ordered in 1946, but only three were delivered and the name was not used. On 22 February 1971, the former Alverton was handed over to the INS, and commissioned on 23 February by Lt. Cdr. Deasy at Gibraltar.

Following her commissioning, Banba, in company with Fola, worked up in the Western Mediterranean so that they could complete Harbour Acceptance Trials and Sea Acceptance Trials. On 20 March both ships left the Mediterranean for home, however on the way a storm blew up forcing them to take refuge in Lisbon. The two newest additions to the Navy finally arrived on 29 March 1971.

In 1984 Banba was decommissioned and sold on to Spanish interests for breaking.

References

Ships built in Southampton
1954 ships
Former naval ships of the Republic of Ireland
Ton-class minesweepers of the Irish Naval Service
Ton-class minesweepers of the Royal Navy
Cold War minesweepers of the United Kingdom